The Lo Nuestro Award for Duranguense Artist of the Year  was an award presented annually by American network Univision. The accolade was established to recognize the most talented performers of Latin music. The nominees and winners were originally selected by a voting poll conducted among program directors of Spanish-language radio stations in the United States and also based on chart performance on Billboard Latin music charts, with the results tabulated and certified by the accounting firm Deloitte. However, since 2004, the winners are selected through an online survey. The trophy awarded is shaped in the form of a treble clef.

The award was first presented to American band Grupo Montez de Durango in 2007, they are the most nominated and awarded performers, with four wins out of eight nominations. Mexican band El Trono de México are the most nominated act without a win, with five unsuccessful nominations. In 2014, the category was disestablished.

Winners and nominees
Listed below are the winners of the award for each year, as well as the other nominees.

References

Duranguense musicians
Duranguense Artist of the Year
Awards established in 2006
Awards disestablished in 2014